Agathe Georgette Ngani (born 26 May 1992) is a Cameroonian football midfielder.

As a tall and strong central midfielder, Ngani is nicknamed Yaya Touré after the male footballer from Ivory Coast. She has played for Scorpion du Moungo, AS Locomotive de Yaoundé and Louves Miniproff de Yaoundé.

Ngani was deemed too inexperienced to be selected in Cameroon's squad for the 2014 African Women's Championship, but made her national team debut in April 2015.

References

External links 
 

1992 births
Living people
Women's association football midfielders
Cameroonian women's footballers
Cameroon women's international footballers
2015 FIFA Women's World Cup players
African Games silver medalists for Cameroon
African Games medalists in football
Competitors at the 2015 African Games
20th-century Cameroonian women
21st-century Cameroonian women